Pinar may refer to:

 Pınar, Turkish feminine given name
 Píñar, municipality located in the province of Granada, Spain
 Pinar del Río, a city of Cuba
 Pinar del Río Province, a province of Cuba
 Pinar, Albania, village in Tirana County, Albania

See also
 El Pinar (disambiguation), several localities, mainly in Spain